Muslim Students Federation (M. S. F.)  may refer to:

 All India Muslim Students Federation, the student wing of All-India Muslim League
 Muslim Students Federation (I. U. M. L.),  the student wing of Indian Union Muslim League 
 Muslim Students Federation (Kerala unit)